Count Eitel Friedrich IV of Hohenzollern (7 September 1545 in Sigmaringen – 16 January 1605 in Hechingen) was the founder and first Count of the line Hohenzollern-Hechingen as Eitel Friedrich I.

Early life 
Eitel Friedrich was the eldest surviving son of Count Karl I of Hohenzollern (1516–1576) from his marriage to Princess Anna of Baden-Durlach (1512–1579), daughter of the Margrave Ernst of Baden-Durlach.

Biography 
After his father's death in 1576, Hohenzollern was divided.  Eitel Friedrich became the founder of the Hohenzollern-Hechingen line; his brother Karl founded the Hohenzollern-Sigmaringen line, and his brother Christoph founded the Hohenzollern-Haigerloch line.  Hohenzollern-Hechingen included the original County of Zollern, with the town of Hechingen and monasteries at Rangendingen, St. Luzen and Stetten.

Eitel Friedrich reorganized the administration of the county, which his predecessors had neglected.  He issued strict hunting and forestry regulation, which led to several uprisings.

In Hechingen, he built a Renaissance style residence, from which the New Castle later evolved.  In 1585, he and his wife founded the Franciscan monastery of St. Luke in Hechingen.  He initiated other construction projects as well, including the St. Lucerne abbey church, the hospital and the lower tower.  His residence became a center of culture and music, earning him the nickname the Magnificent.

He died in 1605 and was buried in the church of the St. Luzen monastery.  In 1609 a bronze grave plate was added to his grave, covering his heart.  It bears the inscription , "Where my treasure lies, there lies my heart" (compare ).

Marriages and issue 
Eitel Friedrich married three times:  

!. He married firstly on 22 June 1568 to Countess Veronika of Ortenburg († 1573), the daughter of Count Karl I of Ortenburg (1501-1552) and his wife, Maximiliana von Fraunberg-Haag (d. 1559). The marriage remained childless.

2. On 14 November 1574 in Meßkirch, he married secondly Countess Sibylle von Zimmern (1558–1599), daughter of Count Froben Christoph of Zimmern and his wife, Countess Kunigunde of Eberstein (1528-1585).  They had the following children:
 Ernst (born: 1575; died young)
 Johann Georg (1577–1623), Prince of Hohenzollern-Hechingen
 married in 1598 Countess Franziska of Salm, Wild- and Rhinegravine of Neufville (d. 1619)
 Maximilian (1580–1633)
 Johanna (1581–1634)
 married in 1602 with Johann, Prince of Hohenzollern-Sigmaringen (1578–1638)

3. On 1 March 1601 he was married for the third time, to Countess Johanna of Eberstein (1570-1633), the daughter of Count Otto of Eberstein-Boldrungen  (1533-1576) and his wife, Baroness Felicitas Colonna von Völs (b. 1535). This marriage also remained childless. After Eitel Friedrich's death Johanna married Baron Johann Friedrich of Königsegg-Aulendorf (d. 1622).

Footnotes

References 

 Allgemeine deutsche Real-encyklopädie für die gebildeten Stände, vol. 7, Brockhaus, 1845, p. 249, (Online)

External links 
 Bio
 Info

Counts of Hohenzollern
House of Hohenzollern
1545 births
1605 deaths
16th-century German people